An altar is a religious structure for sacrifices or offerings.

Altar may also refer to:

Arts and entertainment
 Altar (album), a 2006 album by Sunn O))) and Boris
 Altar (Brazilian band), a dance music band
 Altar (Dutch band), a death metal band
 Altar (film), 2014 film also released as The Haunting of Radcliffe House
 Altar (Romanian band), a metal band
 The Altar, a 2016 album by Banks
 "The Altar" (poem), a 17th-century poem by George Herbert
 "The Altar", a 1989 Christian song by Ray Boltz
 "Altar", a song by Kehlani from Blue Water Road, 2022

Places
 Altar Municipality, a municipality in Sonora, Mexico
 Altar, Sonora, a city in Altar Municipality
 El Altar, an extinct volcano in Ecuador
 The Altar (rock), rock summit in Queen Maud Land of Antarctica
 The Altar, or Ara, a constellation

Religion
 Altar (Bible)
 Altar (Catholicism)
 Altar (Wicca)

See also 
 Alter (disambiguation)
 Altair (disambiguation)